Artisans Asylum is a non-profit community workshop in Allston, Massachusetts. Artisans Asylum was founded in 2010 by an engineer, an artist, and friends who needed an affordable place to build and make things. Artisans was the first makerspace to incorporate in the U.S. in 2012 and today is 40,000 square feet of fabrication space. 

Artisans hosts over 430 members, 160 studios, and 15 workshops. Shops include woodworking, welding, bicycle maintenance and repair, machining, electronics and robotics, jewelry, digital fabrication, a digital photo studio, fiber arts, casting, laser cutting, CNC machines, prop shop, and design lab. The Asylum hosts 30-40 public classes each month, providing hands-on tool training and skills-building courses. As of 2013, the Asylum housed 40 or 50 small manufacturing companies, and raised the number of manufacturing firms in Somerville by 50%. The Asylum is credited with attracting the greentech incubator Greentown Labs to Somerville and contributing to the creative economy in Somerville.

In 2017, Artisans Asylum was featured around the web for hosting MegaBots Inc. as they built their 4.9 meter tall robot fighter, EaglePrime. On October 17, EaglePrime defeated Kuratas, a 6.5 ton battle robot build by Japanese company Suidobashi. The fight was hosted in an abandoned steel mill in Japan, and was live streamed on Twitch.

References

External links
 

Hackerspaces
Hacker culture